Cnemaspis otai, also known commonly as Ota's day gecko or the Vellore day gecko, is a species of lizard in the family Gekkonidae. The species is endemic to southeastern India.

Etymology
The specific name, otai, is in honor of Japanese herpetologist Hidetoshi Ota (born 1959).

Geographic range
C. otai is found in the southern Eastern Ghats in the Indian state of Tamil Nadu.

The type locality is "Vellore Fort, Vellore, North Arcot District, Tamil Nadu, India".

Habitat

Description
Dorsally, it is grayish brown with black spots. Ventrally, it is yellowish cream.

Behavior
C. otai is diurnal and rock-dwelling.

Reproduction
C. otai is oviparous.

References

Further reading
Das I, Bauer AM (2000). "Two New Species of Cnemaspis (Sauria: Gekonidae) from Tamil Nadu, Southern India". Russian Journal of Herpetology 7 (1): 17–28. (Cnemaspis otai, new species).
Ganesh SR, Kalaimani A, Karthik P, Baskaran N, Nagarajan R, Chandramouli SR (2018). "Herpetofauna of Southern Eastern Ghats, India – II From Western Ghats to Coromandel Coast".  Asian Journal of Conservation Biology 7 (1): 28–45.

Cnemaspis
Reptiles described in 2000